Harry Tappen Beach, Marina, and Pool (commonly referred to simply as Tappen Beach) is a town-owned park in Glenwood Landing, in Nassau County, on Long Island, in New York, United States. It is located within and is operated by the Town of Oyster Bay.

Description 
Tappen Beach is located along the eastern shore of Hempstead Harbor. It is also known as East Beach. Amenities at Tappen Beach include the beach, a marina, playground facilities, and a saltwater pool.

In 1977, the pool at Tappen Beach, which was roughly 50 years old, was shut down because it was deemed to be unsafe by inspectors. It was replaced at a cost of roughly $731,000 (1983 USD). While the park was historically only accessible to residents of the town of Oyster Bay, the pool renovations were funded in part by federal dollars from the National Park Service, and federal laws required that the town open the park to the rest of the general public.

See also 
 North Hempstead Beach Park
 Tobay Beach

References 

Oyster Bay (town), New York
Parks in Nassau County, New York